Awaz Television Network is a Sindhi-language television channel with headquarters in Karachi, Pakistan. It was launched in 2009 and broadcasts entertainment and infotainment programs in Sindhi.

Awaz TV is available via satellite on  Paksat as well as on cable operators all around the country.
CEO of Awaz Television is Mr.Faiz Brohi.
Awaz TV hosts many drama, talk shows, morning shows, comedy shows and entertainment shows.

The most popular current affair programs are Sindh Desk, Aakhir Cha Kajey, Jawab Khapey, Crime Watch, Awami Adalat, Hee Aahey Sindh.

Famous entertainment shows are:

Subah Jo Awaz,  Awaz Studio, Awaz Gehfil, Hi tea with Iqra Qureshi, Night Cafe, A 2 Z, Lok geet ain lada and Awaz Comedy Club,

Soomar Sureloo, Hard Line With Shoukat Zardari, Death Line, Subh Jo Awaz, Lok Geet aen Lada, Sonan Khushboo aen Rabeel, and Awaz Night With Yasir Shoroo.

Current talk shows

Daily talkshows
 Hard Line With Shoukat Zardari
 Awaz Today With Mohsin Baarybbar

Weekly talkshows 
 Date Line Sindh
 Sindh Desk

Current morning shows

Daily morning show
 Subh Jo Awaz

Weekly morning show
 Lok Geet Ayn Lada

Current entertainment shows
 Cinema Classic

Awaz night show
 A2Z

Evening shows
 A2Z
 Colors Of Life 
 Evening With Stars 
  Andar Jo Awaz 
 Chef In Kitchen 
 Shaksiyat

Drama
 Aanja Aas Baki
 Amar
 Chring
 Jeevan Jo Imtehaan
 Pinjroo
 Unjjaroo
 Kari Pag

Comedy
 Dado Lesoro
 Mazedaar Mehfil
 Full Comedy

Previous hit shows
 Shaan e Mustafa
 Awaz Ramzan
 Iftaar with Awaz
 Election Special by Awaz

See also

References

External links

Television channels and stations established in 2009
Television stations in Pakistan
Mass media in Karachi
2009 establishments in Pakistan
Television stations in Karachi
Sindhi-language mass media
Mass media companies of Pakistan